Cedar Canyon is an unincorporated community in Meade County, in the U.S. state of South Dakota.

History
Cedar Canyon was laid out in 1909, and named for a local valley where cedar trees are abundant. A post office called Cedar Canyon was established in 1914, and remained in operation until 1949.

References

Unincorporated communities in Meade County, South Dakota
Unincorporated communities in South Dakota